Óscar de Lemos (1906–1954) was a Portuguese stage and film actor.

Selected filmography
 A Aldeia da Roupa Branca (1938)
 João Ratão (1940)
 A Menina da Rádio (1944)
 Gentleman Thief (1946)

References

Bibliography 
 Patricia Vieira. Portuguese Film, 1930-1960,: The Staging of the New State Regime. A&C Black, 2013.

External links 
 

1906 births
People from Viana do Castelo
1954 deaths
Portuguese male film actors